Phil Tuttle (born October 19, 1987, in Hooksett, New Hampshire) is an American soccer player.

Career

College and Amateur
Tuttle is a product of the University of Notre Dame, where during his five years he appeared in 33 games, starting 29 and posted a 0.94 goals against average with nine shutouts. He ended his collegiate career with a 16-10-4 record and helped lead the Irish to the second round of the NCAA Tournament in 2008, 2009 and 2010.

During his college years, Tuttle also played in the USL Premier Development League for Indiana Invaders and New Hampshire Phantoms.

Professional
On January 18, 2011, Tuttle was drafted in the second round (33rd overall) in the 2011 MLS Supplemental Draft by San Jose Earthquakes, but was released by the club without signing. Tuttle signed his first professional contract with Harrisburg City Islanders on April 12, 2011.

References

External links
 Notre Dame profile

1987 births
Living people
American soccer players
Notre Dame Fighting Irish men's soccer players
Indiana Invaders players
Seacoast United Phantoms players
Penn FC players
Wilmington Hammerheads FC players
USL League Two players
USL Championship players
People from Hooksett, New Hampshire
San Jose Earthquakes draft picks
Soccer players from New Hampshire
Association football goalkeepers